Heydel is a surname of German origin. Notable people with the surname include:

Karl Rudolf Heydel (1911-1936), German racing driver
Magdalena Heydel (born 1969), Polish philologist and translator

References

Surnames of German origin